The Observatory of Strasbourg is an astronomical observatory in Strasbourg, France.

Following the Franco-Prussian War of 1870–71, the city of Strasbourg became part of the German Empire. The  University of Strasbourg was refounded in 1872 and a new observatory began construction in 1875 in the Neustadt district. The main instrument was a 50 cm Repsold refractor, which saw first light in 1880 (see Great refractor). At the time this was the largest instrument in the German Empire. In 1881, the ninth General Assembly of the Astronomische Gesellschaft met in Strasbourg to mark the official inauguration.

The observatory site was selected primarily for instruction purposes and political symbolism, rather than the observational qualities. It was a low-lying site that was prone to mists. During the period up until 1914, the staff was too small to work the instruments and so there was little academic research published prior to World War I. The main observations were of comets and variable stars. After 1909, the instruments were also used to observe binary stars and perform photometry of nebulae.

The observatory is currently the home for the Centre de données astronomiques de Strasbourg, a database for the collection and distribution of astronomical information. This includes SIMBAD, a reference database for astronomical objects, VizieR, an astronomical catalogue service and Aladin, an interactive sky atlas. The modern extension of the building houses Planétarium de Strasbourg. The observatory is surrounded by the Jardin botanique de l'Université de Strasbourg.

In the vaulted basement below the observatory, a university-administered museum is located. Called Crypte aux étoiles ("star crypt"), it displays old telescopes and other antique astronomical devices such as clocks and theodolites.

Notable astronomers 

 Julius Bauschinger
 Adolf Berberich
 André Danjon
 William Lewis Elkin
 Ernest Esclangon
 Ernst Hartwig
 Carlos Jaschek
 Pierre Lacroute
 Otto Tetens
 Friedrich Winnecke
 Carl Wilhelm Wirtz
 Walter Wislicenus

See also 
 List of astronomical observatories

References

External links

Official website of the Observatory
Official website of the Planetarium
Publications of Strasbourg Observatory digitalized on Paris Observatory digital library

University of Strasbourg
Astronomical observatories in France
Buildings and structures in Strasbourg
Planetaria in France
1875 establishments in Germany
 
Museums in Strasbourg
Science museums in France
Hermann Eggert buildings